This is a list of electoral results for the electoral district of Buranda in Queensland state elections.

Members for Buranda
The following people were elected in the seat of Buranda:

Election results

Elections in the 1950s

Elections in the 1940s

Elections in the 1930s

Elections in the 1920s

Elections in the 1910s

References

Queensland state electoral results by district